The London Grand Prix Gold is an open international badminton tournament held in London, England. This tournament has been a Grand Prix Gold level, with total prize money US$120,000.

Previous winners

References

External links
 Official Website London Grand Prix

Badminton tournaments in England
Sports competitions in London